Dr. Josué Francisco Trocado, KCSG (27/28 June 1882 - 8 December 1962) was a Portuguese composer.

Background
Josué Francisco Trocado was born to Francisco Luís Trocado, Jr. and Maria Emília da Cruz Campos in Póvoa de Varzim, and was the paternal grandson of Francisco Luís Trocado and Florbela Rosa, and maternal grandson of Manuel Ferreira Campos and Ana Emília da Cruz.

Life
Josué Francisco Trocado was a doctor, a teacher, a journalist and a composer. He married Maria Alves de Campos on 20 July 1907 in Póvoa de Varzim, and had seven children.

Decorations
 Knight Commander of the Order of St. Gregory the Great of the Holy See
 OC of the Ordem Militar de Cristo

References

 Anuário da Nobreza de Portugal, III, 2006, Tomo IV, pg. 862 to 873
 Costados, Gonçalo de Mesquita da Silveira de Vasconcelos e Sousa, Livraria Esquina, 1.ª Edição, Porto, 1997, N.º 55

1882 births
1962 deaths
Portuguese composers
Portuguese male composers
People from Póvoa de Varzim
20th-century male musicians